Ormazábal is a Basque surname. Notable people with the surname include:

Asier Ormazábal Larizgoitia (born 1982), Spanish footballer 
Manuel Ormazábal Pino (born 1983), Chilean footballer 
Patricio Ormazábal Mozó (born 1979), Chilean footballer,
Ramón Ormazábal Tife (1910–1982), Basque communist politician
Víctor Ormazábal (born 1985), Argentinian footballer

Basque-language surnames